"Nur in meinem Kopf" is a song by German recording artist Andreas Bourani. It was written by Bourani along with Tom Olbrich and Julius Hartog for his debut album Staub & Fantasie (2011), while production was helmed by Andreas Herbig and Peter "Jem" Seifert. Released as Bourani's first single in May 2011, the song became an instant commercial success, reaching the top 20 in Austria, Germany, and Switzerland.

Formats and track listings

Charts

Weekly charts

Year-end charts

References

2011 singles
Andreas Bourani songs
2011 songs
Universal Music Group singles
Songs written by Andreas Bourani